The 2021 Baltic States Athletics Championships was held in Ogre, Latvia, between August 13 and August 14.

All participating countries were eligible to delegate two participants per each event.

Medal table

Results

Men's events

Women's events

References

2021 in Latvian sport
2021 in athletics (track and field)
August 2021 sports events in Europe